Mtoto (1 April 1983 – 24 May 2011) was a British Thoroughbred racehorse. In a career which lasted from 1985 until 1988, he ran ten times and won seven races. He showed some promise as three-year-old in 1986, but emerged as a top-class horse in 1987 when he defeated The Derby winner Reference Point in the Eclipse Stakes at Sandown. In 1988, he was the dominant middle-distance horse in Britain, winning a second Eclipse Stakes and taking the King George VI and Queen Elizabeth Stakes.

Background
Bred by John L. Moore, Mtoto was a bay horse with a white blaze. He was sired by the 1967 British Horse of the Year Busted out of the French mare Amazer.

Racing career
He recovered so well from the foot problems which dogged his early career that when he went to stud, he did so as the winner of the King George VI and Queen Elizabeth Stakes, and double winner of both the Eclipse Stakes and Prince of Wales's Stakes. He very nearly added the Prix de l'Arc de Triomphe to this list too. Mtoto got off to a slow start on the track. By the end of his three-year-old campaign, he had won only once, and that was a small maiden race at Haydock Park. His first important success came as a four-year-old in the Brigadier Gerard Stakes at Sandown Park. In his final year, 1988, he ended a previously unbeaten season with an unlucky, fast closing neck second to Tony Bin in the Arc. Jockey Michael Roberts was blamed by many for poor positioning in this final race, Mtoto rounding the home turn into a short straight behind a wall of horses, in one of the largest Arc fields ever assembled.

Stud career
Mtoto stood at Aston Upthorpe Stud at a fee of £18,000, where he sired Shaamit, Celeric, Serious Attitude and many other horses including Presenting, Arbatax and Maylane. He was retired from stud duties in 2006 and spent his retirement at Aston Upthorpe alongside Zilzal. Mtoto is grandsire to the 2008 Cheltenham Gold Cup winner Denman and 2011 Grand National winner Ballabriggs. On 24 May 2011 it was announced that Mtoto had died aged 28. Later taken as the name of a restored steam tractor (i.e. traction engine) built by John Fowler (Leeds).

Pedigree

References

 The Complete Encyclopedia of Horse Racing - written by Bill Mooney and George Ennor
 Mtoto's Racing Career Galopp-Sieger.de
 Mtoto's Progeny Galopp-Sieger.de

1983 racehorse births
2011 racehorse deaths
Racehorses bred in the United Kingdom
Racehorses trained in the United Kingdom
Thoroughbred family 1-k
King George VI and Queen Elizabeth Stakes winners